Milngavie is one of the seven wards used to elect members of the East Dunbartonshire Council. It elects three Councillors. Its territory (which has not altered since its creation in 2007) consists of the entire burgh of Milngavie, and a sparsely populated hinterland to its north-west, bordering the West Dunbartonshire and Stirling local authority areas. In 2020, the ward had a population of 13,572.

Councillors

Election results

2022 election
2022 East Dunbartonshire Council election

2017 election
2017 East Dunbartonshire Council election

2012 election
2012 East Dunbartonshire Council election

2007 election
2007 East Dunbartonshire Council election

References

Wards of East Dunbartonshire
Milngavie